The National Association for Stock Car Auto Racing, LLC (NASCAR) is an American auto racing sanctioning and operating company that is best known for stock car racing. The privately owned company was founded by Bill France Sr. in 1948, and his son, Jim France, has been the CEO since August 2018. The company is headquartered in Daytona Beach, Florida. Each year, NASCAR sanctions over 1,500 races at over 100 tracks in 48 US states as well as in Canada, Mexico, Brazil and Europe.

History

Early stock car racing

In the 1920s and 1930s, Daytona Beach supplanted France and Belgium as the preferred location for world land speed records. After a historic race between Ransom Olds and Alexander Winton in 1903, 15 records were set on what became the Daytona Beach Road Course between 1905 and 1935. Daytona Beach had become synonymous with fast cars in 1936. Drivers raced on a  course, consisting of a  stretch of beach as one straightaway, and a narrow blacktop beachfront highway, State Road A1A, as the other. The two straights were connected by two tight, deeply rutted and sand covered turns at each end.

Stock car racing in the United States has its origins in bootlegging during Prohibition, when drivers ran bootleg whiskey made primarily in the Appalachian region of the United States. Bootleggers needed to distribute their illicit products, and they typically used small, fast vehicles to better evade the police. Many of the drivers would modify their cars for speed and handling, as well as increased cargo capacity.

The repeal of Prohibition in 1933 dried up some of their business, but by then the people of the American South had developed a taste for moonshine, and a number of the drivers continued "runnin' shine", this time evading the "revenuers" who were attempting to tax their operations. The cars continued to improve, and by the late 1940s, races featuring these cars were being run for pride and profit. These races were popular entertainment in the rural Southern United States, and they are most closely associated with the Wilkes County region of North Carolina. Most races in those days were of modified cars. Street vehicles were lightened and reinforced.

Significant people

William France Sr.

Mechanic William France Sr., moved to Daytona Beach, Florida, from Washington, D.C., in 1935 to escape the Great Depression. He was familiar with the history of the area from the land speed record attempts. France entered the 1936 Daytona event, finishing fifth. He took over running the course in 1938. He promoted a few races before World War II.

France had the notion that people would enjoy watching stock cars race. Drivers were frequently victimized by unscrupulous promoters who would leave events with all the money before drivers were paid. On December 14, 1947, France began talks with other influential racers and promoters at the Ebony Bar at the Streamline Hotel in Daytona Beach, Florida, that ended with the formation of NASCAR on February 21, 1948.

Erwin "Cannonball" Baker

The first Commissioner of NASCAR was Erwin "Cannonball" Baker, a former stock car, motorcycle, and open-wheel racer who competed in the Indianapolis 500 and set over one hundred land speed records. Baker earned most of his fame for his transcontinental speed runs and would prove a car's worth by driving it from New York to Los Angeles. After his death, the famous transcontinental race the 'Cannonball Run' and the film that was inspired by it were both named in his honor.
Baker is enshrined in the Automotive Hall of Fame, the Motorcycle Hall of Fame, and the Indianapolis Motor Speedway Hall of Fame. This level of honor and success in each diverse racing association earned Baker the title of "King of the Road".

Bob "Barky" Barkhimer

In the early 1950s, the United States Navy stationed Bill France Jr., at the Moffett Federal Airfield in northern California. His father asked him to look up Bob Barkhimer in San Jose, California. Barkhimer was a star of midget car racing from the World War II era, and later ran about 22 different speedways as the head of the California Stock Car Racing Association. Young Bill developed a relationship with Bob Barkhimer and his partner, Margo Burke. He went to events with them, stayed weekends with them and generally became very familiar with racing on the west coast. "Barky", as he was called by his friends, journeyed to Daytona Beach and met with Bill France Sr. In the spring of 1954, NASCAR became a stock car sanctioning body on the Pacific Coast under Barky.

Wendell Scott

Wendell Scott was the first African-American to win a race in the Grand National Series, NASCAR's highest level. He was posthumously inducted into the NASCAR Hall of Fame in Charlotte, North Carolina, January 30, 2015.

Founding
On March 8, 1936, a collection of drivers gathered at Daytona Beach, Florida. The drivers brought coupes, hardtops, convertibles, and sports cars to compete in an event to determine the fastest cars, and best drivers. Throughout the race, the heavier cars got bogged down in the sand, while the lightweight Fords navigated the ruts of the course, eventually claiming the top 6 finishes for the race. Of the 27 cars that started the event, only 10 managed to survive the ordeal, as officials halted the event  short of the scheduled  distance. Driver Milt Marion was declared the winner, and a young Bill France placed 5th at the end of the day.

By early 1947, Bill France saw the potential for a unified series of racing competitors. France announced the foundation of the "National Championship Stock Car Circuit", otherwise known as NCSCC. France approached the American Automobile Association, or AAA, in hopes of obtaining financial backing for the venture. When the AAA declined support of the venture, France proceeded to announce a set of rules and awards for the NCSCC. France declared that the winner of the 1947 NCSCC season would receive $1000.00 and a trophy. The season would begin in January 1947 at the Daytona Beach track, and conclude in Jacksonville the following December. Nearly 40 events were logged during the season, and attendance often exceeded the venue's capacity. The competitors were paid as promised, and by the end of the season, driver Fonty Flock was declared the season champion after winning 7 events of the 24 that he entered. Bill France delivered the $1000 and 4-foot high trophy to Flock at the end of the season, along with $3000 in prize money to other drivers who competed throughout the season.

At the end of the 1947 season, Bill France announced that there would be a series of meetings held at the Streamline Hotel in Florida, beginning on December 14, 1947. At 1:00 pm, France called to order the 35 men who represented the NCSCC on the top floor of the hotel. The meeting was the first of four seminars in which France would outline his vision of an organized group of race car drivers. The name originally chosen for the series was National Stock Car Racing Association; when it was pointed out that that name was already in use by a rival sanctioning body, "National Association for Stock Car Auto Racing", proposed by mechanic Red Vogt, was selected as the organization's name.

NASCAR was founded by William France, Sr. on February 21, 1948 with the help of several other drivers of the time. The original plans for NASCAR included three distinct divisions: Modified, Roadster, and Strictly Stock. The Modified and Roadster classes were seen as more attractive to fans. It turned out that NASCAR fans wanted nothing to do with the roadsters, which fans perceived as a Northeast or Midwest series. The roadster division was quickly abandoned, while the modified division now operates as the NASCAR Whelen Modified Tour. The Strictly Stock division was put on hold as American automobile manufacturers were unable to produce family sedans quickly enough to keep up with post-World War II demand. The 1948 schedule featured 52 Modified dirt track races. The sanctioning body hosted its first event at Daytona Beach on February 15, 1948. Red Byron beat Marshall Teague in the Modified division race. Byron won the 1948 national championship. Things had changed dramatically by 1949, and the Strictly Stock division was able to debut with a  exhibition in February near Miami.

The first NASCAR "Strictly Stock" race ever was held at Charlotte Speedway, although this is not the same track as the Charlotte Motor Speedway that is a fixture on current NASCAR schedule. The race was held on June 19, 1949 and won by driver Jim Roper when Glenn Dunaway was disqualified after the discovery of his altered rear springs. Initially, the cars were known as the "Strictly Stock Division" and raced with virtually no modifications on the factory models. This division was renamed the "Grand National" division beginning in the 1950 season. Over a period of more than a decade, modifications for both safety and performance were allowed, and by the mid-1960s, the vehicles were purpose-built race cars with a stock-appearing body.

Early in NASCAR's history, foreign manufacturers had shown interest in entering the series; the British car manufacturer, MG, found a few of its vehicles entered, with some placing. For example, on August 16, 1963 in the International 200, Smokey Cook drove an MG to a 17th-place finish.

The first NASCAR competition held outside of the U.S. was in Canada, where on July 1, 1952, Buddy Shuman won a 200-lap race on a half-mile (800 m) dirt track in Stamford Park, Ontario, near Niagara Falls.

Sanctioned series

National series

Cup Series

The NASCAR Cup Series (NCS) is the sport's highest level of professional competition. It is consequently the most popular and most profitable NASCAR series. Since 2001, the Cup Series season has consisted of 36 races over 10 months. Writers and fans often use "Cup" to refer to the NCS and the ambiguous use of "NASCAR" as a synonym for the series is common. The 2022 NCS Champion is Joey Logano. The record for most championships is 7, held by three drivers: Richard Petty, Dale Earnhardt, and Jimmie Johnson. Johnson has the record for most consecutive with five consecutive Cup Series drivers' championships from 2006 to 2010. Previously, the most consecutive championships had been three in a row by Cale Yarborough in the late 1970s, the only other time when a driver has won three or more NASCAR Cup Series championships in a row.

The Cup Series had its first title sponsor in 1972. R. J. Reynolds Tobacco Company, which had been banned from television advertising, found a popular and demographically suitable consumer base in NASCAR fans and engaged NASCAR as a promotional outlet. As a result of that sponsorship, the Grand National Series became known as the Winston Cup Series starting in 1971, with a new points system and some significant cash benefits to compete for championship points. In 1972, the season was shortened from 48 races (including two on dirt tracks) to 31. 1972 is often acknowledged as the beginning of NASCAR's "modern era". The next competitive level, called Late Model Sportsman, gained the "Grand National" title passed down from the top division and soon found a sponsor in Busch Beer.

In 2004, Nextel Communications took over sponsorship of the premier series, and formally renamed it the Nextel Cup Series. A new championship points system, the "Chase for the Nextel Cup," (renamed "Chase for the Sprint Cup" in 2008) was also developed, which reset the point standings with ten races to go, making only drivers in the top ten or within 400 points of the leader eligible to win the championship. In 2007, NASCAR announced it was expanding "The Chase" from ten to twelve drivers, eliminating the 400-point cutoff, and giving a ten-point bonus to the top twelve drivers for each of the races they have won out of the first 26. Wins throughout the season would also be awarded five more points than in previous seasons. In 2008, the premier series title name became the Sprint Cup Series, as part of the merger between Nextel and Sprint.

In 2011, NASCAR announced a number of major rules changes, the most significant being abandoning the points system. The winner of a race now receives 43 points, with one-point decrements for each subsequent position (42 for second, 41 for third, and so on). The winner also receives 3 bonus points, and single bonus points are awarded to all drivers who lead a lap, plus the driver who leads the most laps. Another significant change involves the qualifying process for the Chase. The number of qualifying drivers will remain at 12, but only the top 10 will qualify solely on regular-season points. The remaining two Chase drivers will be the two drivers in the next 10 of the point standings (11th through 20th) with the most race wins in the regular season.

In 2014, NASCAR announced another revamp to the Chase format, expanding the Chase pool to 16 drivers, and eliminating four drivers after every three races, leaving four drivers to compete for the championship at the season finale at Homestead. In addition, wins were given an increased emphasis, with the 16 drivers with the most wins (15 if the points leader is winless; points leader will receive an automatic berth) gaining a spot in the chase. If there are fewer than 16 winners, the remaining spots will be filled based on the conventional points system.

Monster Energy became the title sponsor in 2017, which changed the series' name to Monster Energy NASCAR Cup Series. With Monster Energy's title sponsorship, NASCAR also abandoned "The Chase" name and now refers to the last 10 races simply as "the playoffs" similar to most other sports.

After the 2019 season, NASCAR declined an offer from Monster Energy to remain the title sponsor of the top series. On December 5, NASCAR revealed their new sponsorship model. Instead of a singular title sponsor, four "premier partners" (Coca-Cola, Xfinity, Busch Beer and GEICO) would be closely affiliated with the top series, which was simply renamed the NASCAR Cup Series.

Xfinity Series

The NASCAR Xfinity Series is the second-highest level of professional competition in NASCAR. The most recent series champion is Ty Gibbs in 2022.

The modern incarnation of this series began in 1982, with sponsorship by Anheuser-Busch Brewing's Budweiser brand. In 1984 it was renamed to the Busch Grand National Series, then later just the Busch Series. The Anheuser-Busch sponsorship expired at the end of 2007, being replaced by Nationwide Insurance from 2008 to 2014, and the series is now sponsored by Comcast through its Xfinity brand.

The season usually has fewer races than the Cup Series, and the prize money is significantly lower. However, over the last several years, a number of Cup Series drivers have run both the Xfinity and Cup Series events each weekend, using the Xfinity race as a warm-up to the Cup event at the same facility. Furthermore, several drivers not only participated in both Cup and Busch/Nationwide/Xfinity events on the same weekend but also began to compete in both series on a full-time basis. Kevin Harvick was the first Cup series driver to compete full-time in the Busch Series and win a title, actually doing so twice; in 2001, he did this for Richard Childress Racing but only did so out of necessity as Dale Earnhardt's death forced him into the Cup series ahead of RCR's intended schedule for him. His win in 2006, where he raced three separate cars for RCR and his own race team, was the first of five consecutive titles in NBS/NNS that were won by Cup series regulars.

The practice received criticism because it was thought to give the Cup Series teams an unfair advantage, and that the presence of the Cup Series drivers squeezes out Nationwide Series competitors who would otherwise be able to qualify. These dual-series drivers have been labeled "Buschwhackers", a play on words which combines the original series sponsor's name with the notion of being bushwhacked. In May 2007, NNS director Joe Balash confirmed that NASCAR was exploring options to deal with the Buschwhacker controversy. One of the most often-cited proposals was for Cup Series drivers participating in the Nationwide Series to receive no points for their participation in a Nationwide race. In 2007, NASCAR chairman Brian France indicated that all options, except an outright ban of Cup competitors, were still being considered. On January 11, 2011, NASCAR.com reported that beginning with the 2011 season, drivers would be allowed to compete for the championship in only one of NASCAR's three national series in a given season, although they could continue to run in multiple series. This change was officially confirmed by France in a press conference less than two weeks later, and has remained in the NASCAR rules ever since.

Beginning in 2010, the Nationwide cars adapted somewhat to the current "Car of Tomorrow" (or COT) design used by Cup cars, with different bodies from the Cup Series.

In 2016, the Chase format was extended to both the Xfinity and Truck Series. Instead of the four-round, 10-race format used in the Cup Series, the Chase in each of the two supporting series consists of three rounds and seven races in all, with each preliminary round consisting of three races. The Xfinity Series Chase involves 12 drivers instead of the 16 participating in the Cup Series Chase. Four drivers are eliminated at the end of each preliminary round of the Chase in the Xfinity Series, which also mirrors the Cup Series Chase. This means that four drivers are eligible for the series title entering the final race, as in the Cup Series. Similar to Cup, starting in 2017 "The Chase" moniker was dropped and the final seven races are now referred to as the Xfinity Playoffs.

Even with restrictions limiting points earnings to one national series, Cup drivers were still running and winning a vast majority of Xfinity series races through 2015. Starting with the 2015 season finale, NASCAR began to add additional restrictions in regards to Cup drivers running Xfinity races. Beginning in the 2020 season, Cup drivers with more than three years of experience in the top series were limited to five races per season. Furthermore, those same drivers are ineligible to run the regular season finale, NXS playoff races, or Dash 4 Cash races.

Craftsman Truck Series

The NASCAR Craftsman Truck Series features modified pickup trucks. It is one of the three national divisions of NASCAR, together with the Xfinity and Cup Series. The most recent series champion is Zane Smith in 2022.

In 1994, NASCAR announced the formation of the NASCAR SuperTruck Series presented by Craftsman. The first series race followed in 1995. In 1996, the series was renamed the NASCAR Craftsman Truck Series to emphasize Craftsman's involvement. The series was first considered something of an oddity or a "senior tour" for NASCAR drivers, but eventually grew in popularity and has seen drivers move straight to the Cup Series without running a full season in NASCAR Xfinity Series competition. These include Kurt Busch and Carl Edwards (who both ran for Roush Racing). In addition, veteran drivers who have had only moderate success at the other two levels of the sport have revitalized their careers in the truck series, including Ron Hornaday Jr., Todd Bodine, Mike Skinner, and Johnny Benson.

Beginning in 2009, the series became the Camping World Truck Series. In 2019, per a branding request made by Camping World, the series was rebranded as the NASCAR Gander Outdoors Truck Series.

As noted previously, the Chase format was extended to the Truck Series in 2016. The format is identical to that used in the Xfinity Series, except that only eight drivers qualify for the Chase (instead of 12 in the Xfinity Series) and only two drivers are eliminated at the end of each preliminary round (instead of four in the Xfinity Series). As in both the Cup Series and Xfinity Series, four drivers are eligible for the series title entering the final race. Similar to Cup, starting in 2017 "The Chase" moniker was dropped and is now simply referred to as the Truck Series Playoffs.

On May 8, 2018, NASCAR and Camping World announced the Truck Series title sponsor would be moved to Camping World subsidiary Gander Outdoors starting in 2019. The contract through 2022 is scheduled to continue as planned. The series was renamed again in 2020 to the NASCAR Gander RV & Outdoors Truck Series before returning to the Camping World Truck Series name in 2021.

On August 26, 2022 it was announced that the original series' sponsor, Craftsman, would return as the title sponsor starting in the 2023 season.

ARCA Menards Series

The ARCA Menards Series is a racing series that races at big touring series tracks and local racing series tracks. It is primarily a Midwestern United States series. NASCAR acquired the series on April 27, 2018 after being privately owned for 60 years.

International series

Pinty's Series

The NASCAR Pinty's Series is a NASCAR racing series in Canada that derives from the old CASCAR Super Series (founded in 1981 and bought out by NASCAR in 2006). The new series has races through six of Canada's provinces for a total of 13 events with TV coverage on TSN. Many drivers are content running in Canada while others move up to bigger NASCAR series including J. R. Fitzpatrick and D. J. Kennington. The cars are a bit different from the cars seen in America, being more akin to a late model, though steel tube-framed silhouette bodies powered by V8 engines is still the norm.

PEAK Mexico Series

In December 2006, NASCAR also announced the creation of a new series in Mexico, the NASCAR Corona Series (now PEAK Mexico Series), replacing the existing Desafío Corona Series, to begin in 2007.

In 2004, NASCAR also began to sanction a mini stock racing series in Mexico, known as the Mexico T4 Series.

Whelen Euro Series

In early 2012, NASCAR announced that it would sanction the existing European-based Racecar Euro Series as a "NASCAR Touring Series". On July 1, 2013, with partnership from NASCAR Whelen Engineering, the series was renamed the NASCAR Whelen Euro Series.

Regional racing series

In addition to the six main national series, NASCAR operates several other racing divisions under the NASCAR Roots banner.

Weekly Series

Many local race tracks across the United States and Canada run under the NASCAR Advance Auto Parts Weekly Series banner, where local drivers are compared against each other in a formula where the best local track champion of the nation wins the Whelen All-American Weekly Series National Championship. The Whelen All-American series is split into four car divisions as well as state and track championships separately. Each division champion receives a point-fund money payout and even more goes to the National champion (driver with most points out of the four division winners). The Whelen All-American Series is the base for stock car racing, developing NASCAR names such as Clint Bowyer, Jimmy Spencer, Tony Stewart, the Bodine brothers, and many others along the way.

Whelen Modified Tour

The Whelen Modified Tour races open-wheel "modified" cars in Northern and Southern divisions. This is NASCAR's oldest division, and the modern division has been operating since 1985 as the Winston Modified Series and later in 1994 as the Featherlite Trailers Modified Series.

ARCA Menards Series East and West

The ARCA Menards Series' feeder divisions, which consists of East and West divisions, race pro-stock cars that are similar to older Xfinity Series cars, although they are less powerful. The east division was originally divided into the Busch North series, which raced in Northeastern states, and the Busch East Series, which raced throughout Southeastern and Mid-Atlantic states. The west division was originally known as the Winston West Series and raced throughout Southwestern and Coastal Pacific states. In 2008, the series came together in east and west divisions under sponsorship from Camping World as the Camping World Series. K&N Filters took over the sponsorship in 2010. 2019 was the last season for both of the series before they are to go under the ARCA banner in 2020 as part of the unification of the NASCAR K&N Pro Series East and West and the ARCA Menards Series. The series became known as the ARCA Menards Series East and ARCA Menards Series West starting in 2020, meaning 2019 was also K&N's last year as the series title sponsor.

AutoZone Elite and other divisions

In the past, NASCAR also sanctioned the AutoZone Elite Division, which raced late-model cars that were lighter and less powerful than Cup Series cars, and was originally split into four divisions: Northwest, Southwest, Southeast, and Midwest. At the end of 2005, NASCAR announced that the AutoZone Elite Division would be discontinued after the 2006 season due to having trouble securing NASCAR-sanctioned tracks to successfully host AutoZone Elite Division events, plus escalating costs of competing and downsizing of the Division in recent years. In 2003, NASCAR standardized rules for its AutoZone Elite and Grand National divisions regional touring series as to permit cars in one series to race against cars in another series in the same division. The top 15 (Grand National) or 10 (AutoZone Elite) in each series will race in a one-race playoff, called the NASCAR Toyota All-Star Showdown, to determine the annual AutoZone Elite and Grand National champions. This event has been hosted at Irwindale Speedway in California since its inception.

Many drivers move up through the series before reaching the Cup Series. In 2002, over 9,000 drivers had licenses from NASCAR to race at all levels.

The winners of the All-American Series National Championship, the ARCA Menards Series, ARCA East and ARCA West championships, the Whelen Modified and Grand National Divisions, and the three national series are invited to Las Vegas in December to participate in Champions Week ceremonies.

Online racing series

eNASCAR Coca-Cola iRacing Series

In 2010, NASCAR officially sanctioned its first sim racing eSports series, partnering with iRacing to form the NASCAR iRacing.com Series. This sim racing series is made of up of five "Amateur Series" divisions, the NASCAR iRacing.com Pro Series, and the PEAK Antifreeze NASCAR iRacing Series (NPAiS), one of iRacing's World Championship Series. Each year, the champion of the NASCAR iRacing.com World Championship Series is invited to NASCAR's Championship Weekend at Homestead-Miami Speedway to receive $10,500 prize money and NASCAR championship trophy at the track.

In 2018, iRacing announced a new, sanctioned qualifying ladder system for the NPAiS, the Road to Pro Series, using virtual Chevrolet and Toyota Camping World Trucks. At the same time, the NASCAR iRacing Pro Series would switch to using the Xfinity Series Camaro, Mustang and Camry models, in order to replicate the progression to the real life Cup series cars used in the NPAiS.

In 2020, Coca-Cola became the entitlement sponsor of the series and it was renamed the eNASCAR Coca-Cola iRacing Series. With the sponsorship, the prize pool increased to $300,000. Additionally, six races will be televised on NBCSN.

eNASCAR Ignite Series
The series was created as a developmental league by NASCAR and iRacing for aspiring gamers ages 13–16. The simulator begins with US Legends cars before moving to Modified Tour cars.

Driver safety

Although NASCAR frequently publicizes the safety measures it mandates for drivers, these features have historically only been adopted long after they were initially developed, and only in response to an injury or fatality. Fire-retardant driver suits were required only years after the death of Fireball Roberts, who died from complications of burns suffered in a crash when flames engulfed his car during a Charlotte race. Only after the deaths of Adam Petty, Kenny Irwin and Tony Roper in 2000 and Dale Earnhardt in 2001 did NASCAR revisit the idea of decreasing the G-forces a driver sustained during a crash. Other examples of available safety features that were slow to be implemented include the "kill switch" throttle, which was mandated after the death of Adam Petty, along with the requirements of an anti-spill bladder in fuel cells. The impact-absorbing "SAFER Barrier" had been in use as early as 1998, but NASCAR hesitated to install those walls out of concerns that they may bring about unintended consequences of aggravating the crashes, and possibly because of the effort needed to clean up the debris from the damaged walls. Dale Earnhardt fatally suffered a fracture to the base of his skull after his car slammed into the concrete wall in the 2001 Daytona 500. Earnhardt's death prompted NASCAR to implement the SAFER barrier and consider drastic improvements to the safety of the drivers. One of these would require all drivers to use the "HANS device" (Head And Neck Support Device), a device that keeps the driver's neck from going forward in a wreck. The mandate came about in October after Blaise Alexander, racing for the ARCA series, died in a crash that resulted in the same injuries sustained as Earnhardt. NASCAR redesigned the racing vehicle with safety improvements, calling it the Car of Tomorrow, which debuted in 2007. The car had a higher roof, wider cockpit, and the driver seat was located more toward the center of the vehicle.

The death of Dale Earnhardt has been seen as a "wake-up" call for NASCAR.

Criticism

NASCAR has been the target of criticism on various topics from various sources. Some critics note the significant differences between today's NASCAR vehicles and true "stock" cars. Others frequently cite the dominance of the France family in NASCAR's business structure, policies, and decision making. Recently, the increased number of Cup drivers competing consistently in the Xfinity Series races has been hotly debated. Another general area of criticism, not only of NASCAR but other motorsports as well, includes questions about fuel consumption, emissions and pollution, and the use of lead additives in the gasoline. Originally scheduled for 2008, NASCAR adopted the use of unleaded fuel in all three of its top series in 2007. In 2011, NASCAR switched to E15 "green" fuel (15% ethanol and 85% gasoline) for all three touring series.

As NASCAR has made moves to improve its national appeal, it has begun racing at new tracks, and ceased racing at some traditional ones – a sore spot for the traditional fan base. Most recently, NASCAR has been challenged on the types and frequency of caution flags, with some critics suggesting the outcome of races is being manipulated, and that the intention is not safety, as NASCAR claims, but closer racing.
There have been a few accidents involving fans during races and even some off the tracks, but no spectator has ever been killed during a race in an accident relating to the race, although a fan was killed by a lightning strike in 2012 after the 2012 Pennsylvania 400 at Pocono was called short due to the storm. It was revealed in 2008 that a wrongful death lawsuit against NASCAR stemming from the crash of a company plane was settled for $2.4 million.

For years, NASCAR had been under criticism for allowing the Confederate flag to be flown during races. Former chairman Brian France tried to ban the flying of Confederate flags at race tracks in 2015, which caused anger among fans. It had previously asked fans to voluntarily stop flying the flag after the 2015 Charleston church shooting, but this did not end the practice. Bubba Wallace, the only African-American NASCAR top-circuit driver, drove the 2020 spring Martinsville race in a car with Black Lives Matter livery, and appeared in an anti-racism video with a number of white drivers. On June 10, 2020, in the wake of protests related to the murder of George Floyd, NASCAR announced that the display of the Confederate flag will be prohibited from all of its events and properties.

In February 2022, the U.S. 11th Circuit Court of Appeals ruled in a lawsuit against Bitconnect that the Securities Act of 1933 extends to targeted solicitation using social media. In April 2022, a class-action lawsuit was filed in Florida against the LGBcoin cryptocurrency company, NASCAR, stock car racing driver Brandon Brown, and political commentator Candace Owens alleging that the defendants made false or misleading statements about the LGBcoin and that the founders of the company had engaged in a pump and dump scheme.

Global expansion
In 2006, Toyota announced they would be joining NASCAR's ranks. Toyota generated early success winning several races off performances from Denny Hamlin and Kyle Busch. Any increase in foreign competition is expected to raise the price of putting a car on the track.

Another topic on the NASCAR circuit is the increase in foreign born drivers and the effects they may have on the future of NASCAR. Juan Pablo Montoya, Patrick Carpentier, and Dario Franchitti are among the foreign-born big names who have crossed over from Formula One and the Indy racing circuit. These drivers have made an impact on NASCAR not only by winning races and dominating road courses, but by expanding NASCAR's point of view.

NASCAR included a race at the Mexican road course Autódromo Hermanos Rodríguez in the Nationwide Series schedule from 2005 through 2008, as well as a race in Montreal, Canada at Circuit Gilles Villeneuve from 2007 through 2012, with the Camping World Truck Series adding a date at Canadian Tire Motorsport Park in 2013. There has been talk of possible expansion with exhibition races in Japan and a return to Canada.

Expanding into international markets could increase NASCAR's popularity and allow foreign sponsors and manufacturers to get involved in the sport.  Some think this could be a very positive move for NASCAR, which has seen its television ratings drop 21 percent between 2005 and 2007. During the same 2-year period, NASCAR also saw the greatest drop in tickets prices observed in over a decade. In 2010, NASCAR saw television ratings drop 10% from the year before, which was down 33% off its peak in 2005. Some think that an increase in international diversity would translate into growth and generate greater opportunities for NASCAR fans.

NASCAR.com
In October 2000, Turner Sports acquired the digital rights to NASCAR, and subsequently took over its website, which features news, information, and interactive features (such as RaceView and RaceBuddy) surrounding its series. While NASCAR had extended Turner's contract to operate the site through 2016, the association announced in January 2012 that it would take operation of the site back in-house in 2013. As a result, a new NASCAR.com was launched on January 3, 2013, which features a multimedia-oriented design enhanced to provide a higher level of fan interaction, and provide an improved second screen experience for viewers on mobile devices.

On May 7, 2019, NASCAR announced a sports betting content partnership with The Action Network to provide editorial content and analysis to NASCAR.com, including recommended picks and value bets. NASCAR said the partnership was intended to prepare for the spread of legal sports betting in the U.S. following the 2018 U.S. Supreme Court ruling overturning the federal PASPA sports betting prohibition. NASCAR previously struck an exclusive deal with sports data solutions provider Genius Sports to develop an official NASCAR gaming offering for legal sportsbooks.

Subsidiaries and 'sister' organizations

NASCAR Digital Media
NASCAR Digital Media is a television production company located in Charlotte, North Carolina, United States. The company is a subsidiary of NASCAR and produces programs designed to promote the sport of professional stock car racing. It also manages the NASCAR website, as well as some websites related to the sport such as Racing-Reference and Jayski's Silly Season Site (as of 2019, after ESPN.com stopped hosting the website).

International Speedway Corporation
While originally not officially connected to NASCAR, International Speedway Corporation (ISC) was founded by Bill France Sr. in 1953 to construct and manage tracks at which NASCAR holds competitions. In May 2019, it was announced that NASCAR would purchase ISC and inherit 12 tracks.  On October 18, 2019, the acquisition of ISC by NASCAR was completed. This made the company a division within NASCAR.

ARCA 
The Automobile Racing Club of America was purchased by NASCAR in 2018.

Grand-Am
The Grand American Road Racing Association (Grand-Am) was a sanctioning body of sports car racing. While it was founded independently of NASCAR by several members of the France family, NASCAR took over Grand-Am, but allowed it to operate autonomously.  The series merged with the American Le Mans Series in 2014 as a part of NASCAR's purchase of IMSA.

IMSA

Education
NASCAR Technical Institute located in Mooresville, North Carolina, is the country's first technical training school to combine a complete automotive technology program and a NASCAR-specific motor sports program, and is the exclusive educational partner of NASCAR.

NASCAR Kinetics was established in 2009 with the mission of connecting college students nationwide to NASCAR, and mentored its last round of students in 2013.

NASCAR in culture
Movies about NASCAR racing include Days of Thunder (1990), Herbie: Fully Loaded (2005), Talladega Nights: The Ballad of Ricky Bobby (2006), Ta Ra Rum Pum (2007), and Logan Lucky (2017).

NASCAR racing heavily influenced Pixar's Cars franchise, with the third film in particular drawing inspiration from NASCAR's history.

NASCAR drivers have made appearances in many television series and TV movies, including The Cleveland Show, Sullivan & Son, and Last Man Standing.

NASCAR partnered up with popular Roblox game Jailbreak, and the partnership was launched on November 5.

See also

 List of the closest NASCAR Cup Series finishes
 Criticism of NASCAR
 List of foreign-born NASCAR race winners
 List of NASCAR champions
 List of NASCAR drivers
 List of NASCAR seasons
 List of NASCAR series
 List of NASCAR teams
 List of NASCAR tracks
 List of NASCAR video games
 NASCAR Angels
 NASCAR dad
 NASCAR Hall of Fame
 NASCAR in Australia
 NASCAR Rookie of the Year
 NASCAR rules and regulations
 NASCAR's 50 Greatest Drivers

Notes
 The largest NASCAR tracks can accommodate upwards of 190,000 people in the stands and infield, far larger than any non-motorsport venue in North America.

References

External links

 

 
1948 establishments in the United States
Auto racing organizations in the United States
Companies based in Volusia County, Florida
Motorsport in North Carolina
Sports governing bodies in the United States
Sports in the Southern United States
Sports leagues in the United States
Stock car racing
Sports leagues established in 1948
Professional sports leagues in the United States